The VTA light rail system serves San Jose and nearby cities in Santa Clara County, California. Originally opened on December 11, 1987, the light rail system has gradually expanded since then, and currently has 60 stations in operation.

The light rail system has been criticized for being one of the least used in the United States (24.3 passenger trips per revenue hour) and the most heavily subsidized ($9.30 per passenger trip). VTA leaders have admitted that building light rail was a poor match with adjoining land uses.

Service

Lines 
VTA operates  of light rail route on 3 lines. All the lines and the corridors they run through are designed to move passengers from the suburban areas of Santa Clara Valley into the major business areas in Downtown, the Santa Clara County Civic Center, and northern Silicon Valley, site of many high-tech company offices.

Light Rail also serves to connect travelers to other transportation systems at several key points: Diridon station offers connections to Caltrain, ACE, Amtrak's Coast Starlight, the Capitol Corridor trains; Milpitas station offer connections the BART system; and Metro/Airport station offers a connection to the San Jose International Airport via VTA Bus route 60.

Lines run for 19 hours per day on weekdays, with headways of 15 minutes for most of the day as of October, 2022. On weekends, the train runs at 30-minute headways for most of the day. After around 8 pm on both weekdays and weekends, trains run at 30 to 60-minute headways. The light rail frequency does not meet VTA's definition of "frequent service."

The system is mostly double-tracked with overhead catenary wires. It variously runs along the medians of former railroad rights of way, freeways and surface streets, and pedestrian malls.

Blue Line 

From north to south, the Blue Line starts at Baypointe station in North San Jose, travels south on First Street on tracks shared with the Green Line through downtown San Jose, until reaching the San Jose Convention Center where the line enters the median of State Route 87, until it approaches the interchange with State Route 85, where it briefly exits the median to serve Ohlone/Chynoweth station and enters the median of State Route 85 to its terminus at the Santa Teresa station in South San Jose.

Green Line 

From north to south, the Green Line starts at Old Ironsides station in Santa Clara, travels east along a section of track in the median of Tasman Drive, shared with the Orange Line, at First Street, the line turns south onto tracks shared with the Blue Line through downtown San Jose, until reaching the San Jose Convention Center where lines split the Green Line continues west to Diridon Station, then turns towards the southwest to its terminus at the Winchester station in southern Campbell.

Orange Line 

From west to east, the Orange Line starts at Downtown Mountain View station in Mountain View, California, travels toward the east, passing under U.S. Route 101 at Ellis Avenue, following Mathilda Avenue to Java Drive, crossing State Route 237 and turning east on Tasman Drive, which eventually becomes Capitol Avenue. For the rest of the trip, the line follows Capitol Avenue until it reaches its terminus, the Alum Rock Transit Center in San Jose.

Previous lines

Almaden Shuttle

The Almaden shuttle was a 3-stop spur from the Ohlone/Chynoweth station to Almaden station at the Almaden Expressway in the Almaden Valley. The shuttle, which ran a single 1-car train, took about 4 minutes to travel between Ohlone/Chynoweth and Almaden. This line had one track, with sidings at Almaden and Ohlone/Chynoweth. The line was discontinued in December 2019 and replaced by bus service.

Commuter Express 
The Commuter Express service operated along the same route as the current Blue Line between Baypointe and Santa Teresa stations, with nonstop service between Convention Center and Ohlone/Chynoweth stations. This weekday, peak-period service offered three trips in the morning and three trips in the evening. The service was introduced in October 2010 and was eliminated in August 2018 because of low ridership.

Stations

Unusually for light rail systems in the United States, most VTA Light Rail stops are made by request. Similar to VTA's bus network, passengers must be visible to the operator while waiting at stations and must notify the operator using the bell before the train arrives at their destination. Trains will typically skip stops (other than line termini) if no one is waiting on the platform and no one requests to disembark.

History
Santa Clara County began planning for a light rail system in the mid-1980s, after the successful opening of the San Diego Trolley in 1981 and amid a surge in light rail construction in mid-sized cities nationwide (Buffalo, Denver, Portland and Sacramento also built systems at the same time).

The county received $2 million from the federal government in 1982 to fund the preliminary engineering phase for the County’s first light rail line. The operation of the line and some of the construction costs would be funded by a half-cent sales tax for a transit district voters in Santa Clara county had approved in 1976. The light rail proposal was championed by County Supervisor Rod Diridon Sr. and Congressman Norman Mineta.

The first phase, then called the Guadalupe Line, opened for revenue service on December 11, 1987, running between Old Ironsides station (near the Great America theme park and Silicon Valley office parks) and a temporary Civic Center station at First and Younger (near the junction to VTA's Guadalupe Division rail yard on Younger). The second phase opened about six months later on June 17, 1988 and extended the rails south from a permanent Civic Center station (replacing the temporary First and Younger station) through a transit mall in Downtown San Jose to Convention Center station. The third phase opened on August 17, 1990 and extended rails into the median of California State Route 87 (Guadalupe Freeway) to Tamien station, adding the first connection to Caltrain. The fourth and final phase of the Guadalupe Line opened on April 25, 1991, adding rails in the median of California State Route 85 (West Valley Freeway) to a terminus at Santa Teresa station just off the freeway in South San Jose. At the same time, the now abandoned Almaden spur line opened.

The system's first major expansion, Tasman West, opened in 1999, extending the rails from the northern end of the Guadalupe line to Mountain View.

In May 2001, the first phase of the Tasman East extension opened, connecting the Tasman West line to Milpitas. New Kinki Sharyo low-floor light rail vehicles were introduced to this line the following year.  Phase two of the Tasman East and the Capitol extension, completed in 2004, brought service east to the Great Mall of the Bay Area and the Alum Rock Transit Center.

On October 1, 2005, the first phase of the Vasona extension was completed, extending the system from downtown San Jose through San Jose Diridon station to the Winchester Transit Center along a former Union Pacific Railroad right of way.

The agency had ambitious plans to expand the light rail system, that have mostly been cancelled. The Capitol Expressway extension has been truncated a proposed  line (see Capitol Expressway extension section), phase two of the Vasona extension has been cancelled, and the Santa Clara / Alum Rock extension became a bus rapid transit line, Rapid 522. No new lines have been added to the system since 2005.

The system received a major reconfiguration in 2019 and 2020, coinciding with the completion of the Silicon Valley BART extension. The Orange Line was established between Mountain View, Milpitas (the new BART station), and Alum Rock, the Blue Line was truncated at Baypointe, and the Almaden Shuttle line was discontinued entirely and replaced with a new bus route. In addition, two stations were renamed: "Montague" became "Milpitas" and "I-880/Milpitas" was changed to "Alder" to avoid confusion with the renamed Milpitas station.

On May 26, 2021, a mass shooting occurred at the VTA light rail yard (Guadalupe Division). Ten people, including the gunman, were killed during the shooting, the deadliest in the history of the San Francisco Bay Area. As a result of the shooting, the entire light rail system was shut down for months. The system partially restarted on August 30, 2021, and fully restarted on September 18, 2021.

Notes

Criticism 
VTA's light rail system has been criticized for being one of the least used in the United States, and consequently one of the most heavily subsidized.

A 2019 report by the Civil Grand Jury of Santa Clara County compared VTA and its light rail system to other transit operators with light rail systems that served comparably sized areas. They found that the VTA served 24.3 passenger trips per revenue hour, making it the second least effective transit system of the group. In terms of efficiency, VTA had the highest cost per passenger trip ($9.30) and the second-highest increase in costs (65%). Comparing the light rail systems alone, VTA had the lowest farebox recovery (9.3%) in the peer group.

The Grand Jury also found that VTA had failed to “accurately estimate the ongoing operating and capital costs of maintaining the light-rail system,” concluding that that failure, “has led, in part, to (the agency's) recurring financial deficits.” The VTA has said that the operating costs could be cut in half and farebox recovery doubled if a bus-only system were deployed.

Two of VTA's former board chairs, Teresa O’Neill and Sam Liccardo said they agreed with many of the report’s criticisms, and placed the blame on poor planning by the agency in the 1980s and poor land-use decisions in the years since the system was built out.  Along much of the light rail routes, trains don't serve densely populated areas but instead run past single-story office buildings, single-family homes and empty lots. Both Liccardo and O’Neill have advocated for replacing light rail with alternative technologies, like autonomous electric buses, that could be less expensive to operate.

As part of its findings, the Grand Jury recommended the VTA board to abandon its plans for an extension of the Orange Line to the Eastridge Transit Center (see: Capitol Expressway extension section). The  project would attract approximately 611 new riders (after considering the reduction in ridership on the existing parallel bus lines). The board rejected that recommendation saying that the project had been approved by voters.

Rolling stock

From 1987 when the system was launched until September 2003, the system was served by a fleet of high-floor light rail vehicles (LRVs) built by Urban Transportation Development Corporation and designated as ALRV. The first car arrived in March 1987. Accessibility for disabled riders was provided by wheelchair lifts at each station. The original high-floor fleet was leased to investors (for a 33-year term, starting in 1998), and then subleased back to VTA. In May 2003, VTA sub-subleased the UTDC LRVs to other light rail operators for an initial 13-year term, with a renewal term of 9 years; VTA retains responsibility for LRV operation, maintenance, and insurance. 29 were sent to Utah Transit Authority (UTA, $5.2 million rental payments), and 21 were sent to Sacramento Regional Transit (RT, $4.1 million rental payments). In September 2013, RT exercised its option to purchase the 21 sub-leased vehicles at $1,000 each. UTA subsequently exercised its purchase option for the 29 sub-leased vehicles in 2017. 28 of the UTA vehicles, renumbered 1042–1069, were sold at auction on December 26, 2017. The UTA cars were withdrawn from service in 2018.

In 2002, VTA introduced a fleet of 100 new Kinki Sharyo low-floor LRVs. The low-floor LRVs initially operated only on the Tasman West line (Downtown Mountain View to I-880/Milpitas), because their floor height only matched the  platform height along that line. After VTA reconstructed platforms along North First Street from the Japantown/Ayer stop northward (with wooden ramps provided for the lead car's front door elsewhere), VTA replaced the entire fleet in 2003 with low-floor LRVs. Currently, all stations provide level boarding at all doors. Trains are usually coupled in two LRV consists, which was reduced to one during the COVID-19 pandemic, but has since been restored to two cars.

Major accidents and incidents

Virginia station derailment
On March 21, 2008, at approximately 7:10 p.m., a southbound 2-car light rail train derailed just north of the Virginia station.  Four people, including the train operator, were injured, and the train was heavily damaged.  At the time of the accident, trains were operating on a single track through the area because of construction at three nearby light rail stations.  The train involved was attempting to switch between tracks when it derailed.  VTA ruled out mechanical or equipment failure as a cause for the accident. An investigation indicated human error ("the train traveling southbound stopped over the switch and reversed, which are violations of operating rules").

Lincoln Avenue collision
On July 8, 2018, at around 12:34 p.m., a northbound single car light rail train collided with a car in the Lincoln Avenue crossing near Auzerais Avenue on the Mountain View-Winchester Line. Two occupants of the car were killed. The train operator was taken to a hospital according to standard operating procedures. The twenty passengers on the train were not seriously injured. The lead segment of the train (934B) left the tracks and knocked down a pole supporting the LRT catenary wires.

San Jose maintenance yard shooting

On May 26, 2021, a mass shooting occurred at a VTA rail yard in San Jose, California. Ten people, including the gunman, were killed during the shooting. It is the deadliest mass shooting in the history of the San Francisco Bay Area. As a result of the shooting, service was suspended indefinitely across the light rail system and returned in stages throughout August and September.

Future

Capitol Expressway extension 
The Capitol Expressway extension the light rail extension would carry the Orange Line south of the Alum Rock station to the Eastridge Transit Center on an elevated median along Capitol Expressway. In 2012, VTA finished improving pedestrian and bus conditions on Capitol Expressway, with new sidewalks, bus shelters and improved landscaping. Eastridge Transit Center was rebuilt in 2015. Two stations are included in the plan at Story Road and Eastridge, with an optional intermediate station at Ocala Avenue. VTA approved the final environmental impact statement of this segment in June 2019, with construction expected the following year and passenger service in about 2025.

The  project was criticized in a 2019 report by the Civil Grand Jury of Santa Clara County (see: Criticism section). The Grand Jury recommended the VTA board to abandon the extension because the project would attract approximately 611 new riders (after considering the reduction in ridership on the existing parallel bus lines). The board rejected that recommendation saying that the project had been approved by voters.

References

External links

 Official Santa Clara Valley Transportation Authority website
 VTA Roster

 
Electric railways in California
Light rail in California
Airport rail links in the United States
750 V DC railway electrification
Railway lines opened in 1987
1987 establishments in California
Santa Clara Valley Transportation Authority